The 2016 USAFL National Championships were the 20th installment of the premier United States annual Australian rules football club tournament. The tournament as held at the Premier Sports Campus in Lakewood Ranch, Florida, on October 15–16.  The tournament saw a total of 41 teams representing 34 USAFL clubs and three from AFL Canada.

Recap 
The Austin Crows picked up their second consecutive Men's Division 1 premiership by sweeping the group stage and then defeating the Golden Gate Roos 39-13 in the Grand Final.  The Roos' appearance in the Final was their first at the D1 level since 1999.  Nolan Cox, brother of Collingwood Football Club player Mason Cox, was named most consistent for the tournament in helping the Crows to their third D1 flag in three years.  Austin's 4-0 record completed a perfect 18-0 season, and extended their win streak to 23 games, the second longest in Men's USAFL history.  Elsewhere, the Calgary Kangaroos won their second ever Division 2 title, the Portland Steelheads became the first D3 team to win back to back titles, and the Ohio Valley River Rats won their fifth Division 4 premiership.

In Women's Division 1, the Denver Lady Bulldogs saw their six-year streak of National Championships snapped, falling to the San Francisco Iron Maidens.  The Maidens, who are the women's arm of the Golden Gate Australian Football League, beat Denver 9-6 in their first game on Sunday afternoon, then defeated the Minnesota Freeze 16-6 to finish the round robin competition at 4-0 to clinch the title.  The Division 2 Women's competition, made up of three combined teams, was won by the team with players from the Portland Sockeyes, Seattle Grizzlies, Arizona Hawks, and Tampa Bay ARFC.

Special guests on the weekend were Hawthorn Football Club greats Dermott Brereton and Chris Wittman, who held a coaches clinic on the Friday before the tournament, and also provided broadcast commentary.  A record 30 matches were broadcast live via the USAFL's YouTube channel, including all twelve Men's Division 1 group matches, all fifteen Women's Division matches, and the Men's Division 1, 2, and 3 Grand Finals.

Men's Division 1

Round 1

Round 2

Round 3

Group Stage Ladders (Men's Division 1)

Group A

Group B

Division 1 Men's Grand Final

2016 USAFL National Championships club rankings

Men

Women

References

External links 

USAFL season
Australian rules football competitions
National championships in the United States
Sports competitions in Florida
Sports in Sarasota County, Florida
USAFL National Championships